Calliostoma adelae, common name Adele's top shell, is a species of sea snail, a marine gastropod mollusk in the family Calliostomatidae.

Distribution
This species occurs in the Gulf of Mexico, off Florida and the Florida Keys; in the Atlantic Ocean off Brazil.

Description 
The maximum recorded shell length is 45 mm.

Habitat 
Minimum recorded depth is 2 m. Maximum recorded depth is 24 m.

References

 Rosenberg, G., F. Moretzsohn, and E. F. García. 2009. Gastropoda (Mollusca) of the Gulf of Mexico, pp. 579–699 in Felder, D.L. and D.K. Camp (eds.), Gulf of Mexico–Origins, Waters, and Biota. Biodiversity. Texas A&M Press, College Station, Texas.

External links
 

adelae
Gastropods described in 1951